John R. Arthur Jr. is a notable American materials scientist best known as a pioneer of molecular beam epitaxy.

Together with Alfred Y. Cho, Arthur pioneered molecular beam epitaxy at Bell Laboratories, where he published a paper in July 1968 that described construction of epitaxial gallium arsenide layers using molecular beam epitaxy. They received the 1982 IEEE Morris N. Liebmann Memorial Award "for the development and application of molecular beam epitaxy technology," and the 1982 James C. McGroddy Prize for New Materials from the American Physical Society.

Selected works 
 Arthur Jr., J. R., J. Appl. Phys. 39, 4032–4034 (1968).
 Cho, A. Y.; J. R. Arthur Jr. “Molecular beam epitaxy”. Prog. Solid State Chem., 10: 157–192. (1975).

References 
 IEEE Morris N. Liebmann Memorial Award recipients
 "Atom by Atom, Physicists Create Matter that Nature has Never Known Before", New York Times, June 1, 1982.
 W. Patrick McCray, "MBE deserves a place in the history books", Nature Nanotechnology 2, 259 - 261 (2007) .

21st-century American physicists
Living people
Year of birth missing (living people)
Semiconductor growth